The 1989 PGA Championship was the 71st PGA Championship, held August 10–13 at Kemper Lakes Golf Club in Long Grove, Illinois, northwest of Chicago. Payne Stewart won the first of his three major championships, one stroke ahead of runners-up Andy Bean, Mike Reid, and Curtis Strange.

Weather stopped play on Friday and Saturday with the rounds completed the following morning. In the last pairing, Reid played the final nine holes of the third round on Sunday morning. He nearly led wire-to-wire, but struggled on the final three holes, all with water in play. His tee shot at the 16th hole was pushed and found the water hazard, and he made bogey. On the par-3 17th, Reid stayed dry but misplayed a greenside chip shot from thick rough, then three-putted for double bogey and lost the lead. He had a  birdie putt on the final hole to force a playoff, but did not convert. Stewart was five-under on the final nine and birdied four of the final five holes.

Four months earlier at the Masters, Reid led with five holes to play, but finished sixth after finding water at the 15th hole.

In search of a PGA Championship victory to complete a career grand slam, both Tom Watson and Arnold Palmer were on the first page of the leaderboard after the first round, with 67 and 68, respectively. Watson, 39, tied for ninth at 281 (−7) while Palmer, 59, was well back at 293 (+5). It was the final time that Palmer made the cut at the PGA Championship, though he played in the next five. Watson finished as high as fifth in 1993, but also never secured the title.

Venue

This was the first PGA Tour event at Kemper Lakes, a daily-fee course opened ten years earlier in 1979. It had previously hosted several editions of the PGA Grand Slam of Golf.

Course layout

Source:

Round summaries

First round
Thursday, August 10, 1989

Source:

Second round
Friday, August 11, 1989
Saturday, August 12, 1989

Source:

Third round
Saturday, August 12, 1989
Sunday, August 13, 1989

Source:

Final round
Sunday, August 13, 1989

Source:

Scorecard

Final round

Cumulative tournament scores, relative to par
Source:

References

External links
PGA.com – 1989 PGA Championship

PGA Championship
Golf in Illinois
PGA Championship
PGA Championship
PGA Championship
PGA Championship